The Archdeaconry of St Andrews was a sub-division of the diocese of St Andrews, one of two archdeaconries within the diocese. The St Andrews archdeaconry was headed by the Archdeacon of St Andrews, a subordinate of the Bishop of St Andrews. In the medieval period, the Archdeaconry of St Andrews contained five deaneries with a total of 124 parish churches. The deaneries were Mearns (14 churches), Angus (38 churches), Gowrie (20 churches), Fife (28 churches) and Fothriff (24 churches).

References
 McNeill, Peter G. B. & MacQueen, Hector L. (eds.), Atlas of Scottish History to 1707, (Edinburgh, 1996)
 Watt, D. E. R., Fasti Ecclesiae Scoticanae Medii Aevi ad annum 1638, 2nd draft, (St Andrews, 1969), pp. 304–9

See also
 Archdeaconry of Lothian (other St Andrews archdeaconry)
 Archdeacon of St Andrews, for a list of archdeacons
 Bishop of St Andrews

St Andrews
History of Fife
St Andrews
Religion in Fife